Crunchyroll Expo (CRX) is an annual three-day anime convention held during August/September at the San Jose McEnery Convention Center in San Jose, California over Labor Day weekend. The convention is organized by anime licensor Crunchyroll and LeftField Media.

Programming
The convention typically offers an Artists Alley, Dealers Room, a Masquerade, panels, and video games.

History
Crunchyroll Expo was first held in 2017 at the Santa Clara Convention Center in Santa Clara, California. LeftField Media was brought in to help run the convention. Crunchyroll Expo received most of its ticket sales in the days before the event. MAGWest was held the same weekend, and the conventions partnered to allow attendees to participate in limited events at the other. The convention had staffing and badge check issues, along with autograph ticket confusion. They also had no video rooms.

Crunchyroll Expo for 2018 moved to the San Jose McEnery Convention Center in San Jose, California. They were the same weekend as SacAnime. Crunchyroll partnered with ReedPop to organize Crunchyroll Expo starting in 2020. Crunchyroll Expo 2020 was canceled due to the COVID-19 pandemic. An online event named Virtual Crunchyroll Expo was instead held from September 4–6, 2020. The pandemic also resulted in the 2021 convention's cancellation, and it was again replaced with an online event. 

Crunchyroll Expo 2022 was a hybrid convention, with both physical and online events. The convention featured a new music festival, the Crunchy City Music Fest. Crunchyroll Expo had an attendance cap, and admission was sold out. The convention also had mask and vaccination requirements due to the COVID-19 pandemic, along with increased security. LeftField Media also returned to run the convention. Crunchyroll Expo will not occur in 2023, in order for Crunchyroll to prioritize other events worldwide.

Event history

Virtual Crunchyroll Expo
Due to the cancellation of Crunchyroll Expo 2020 because of the COVID-19 pandemic, an online event named Virtual Crunchyroll Expo was held from September 4–6, 2020. The event featured many Japanese guests including Junji Ito, Soma Saito, Rie Takahashi, Mayumi Tanaka, and pro wrestler Miro. It also included a artists alley, cosplay event, and exhibitor hall. Virtual Crunchyroll Expo 2021 was held from August 5–7, 2021 and also had a significant Japanese guest list.

Crunchyroll Expo Australia
Crunchyroll Expo Australia is a two-day convention held during September at the Melbourne Convention and Exhibition Centre in Melbourne, Australia. The convention in 2022 had issues with long entrance lines outside of the convention center. Attendees had waits of up to five hours in bad weather due to the convention center reaching capacity. Crunchyroll after the convention made refunds available for those who could not enter the event.

Event history

See also

 Crunchyroll
 FanimeCon
 SiliCon

References

External links

 

Anime conventions in the United States
Annual events in California
Conventions in California
Culture of San Jose, California
San Francisco Bay Area conventions
Recurring events established in 2017
2017 establishments in California
Tourist attractions in Santa Clara County, California
Tourist attractions in San Jose, California
Crunchyroll